The 1913–14 season was the 37th Scottish football season in which Dumbarton competed at national level, entering the Scottish Football League, the Scottish Cup and the Scottish Qualifying Cup. In addition Dumbarton played in the Dumbartonshire Cup.

Scottish First Division

Dumbarton's return to 'top flight' league football for the first time since 1896 witnessed a good start which saw the club unbeaten in their first six league outings.  This fine form could not be maintained however and Dumbarton eventually finished 19th out of 20 with 27 points, well behind champions Celtic.

Promotion/Relegation
At the end of the season, only Cowdenbeath from the Second Division applied for admission to the 'top fight' but it was the bottom two in the First Division - Dumbarton and St Mirren - who retained their places in the end of season election.  For the third time a vote was held to allow for automatic promotion/relegation but while the 11-7 vote was in agreement it failed to obtain the two-thirds majority required.

Scottish Cup

The Scottish Cup campaign was short-lived as Dumbarton lost out to Third Lanark in the second round.

Scottish Qualifying Cup
Dumbarton qualified for the Scottish Cup by reaching the fourth round of the Scottish Qualifying Cup before losing to non-league Nithsdale Wanderers.

Dumbartonshire Cup
After an absence of three seasons, Dumbarton entered the Dumbartonshire Cup but as in their previous six attempts were defeated in the final, this time by Renton.

Other Match
There was a benefit match played for long serving player Robert Muirhead, against Third Lanark.

Player statistics

|}

Source:

Transfers

Players in

Players out 

Source:

In addition Samuel Hendry and Alex McGillivray all played their final 'first XI' games in Dumbarton colours.

Reserve Team
Dumbarton lost in the second round of the Scottish Second XI Cup to Kilmarnock.

References

Dumbarton F.C. seasons
Scottish football clubs 1913–14 season